Grafton Entertainment, sometimes referred to as Grafton Records, is an artist management company and record label, with dual-headquarters in both United Kingdom and Nigeria.

History
Grafton Entertainment was formed in 2004 by Tonye Ibiama, who created the company with the  intention to bring the vast talent pool in Port Harcourt into the national and global spotlight. The first artists to join the label's roster were De Indispensables, a hip hop duo consisting of members Lenny B and Tick Lips. They were signed to the company in 2004 following their impressive performance on the Grafton Entertainment Music Hunt. The competition, which was organized by the record label in collaboration with Rhythm 93.7 launched not only De Indispensables but demonstrated the company's  professionalism and efficiency. M Trill became the second artist to be signed to Grafton Entertainment, after De Indispensables.

Grafton endorsed the release of three hugely popular singles by Lenny B and Tick Lips – "Sweet Mama", "Cinderella"  (in Nigeria) and "I Love You" (in the United Kingdom via HMV stores). Throughout 2005, "Sweet Mama" topped various mainstream charts in Nigeria. In the UK, it charted at number 16 on the UK DMC Urban chart. The other single titled "I Love You" debuted at number-three on the R&B charts and at number thirty-seven on the UK Top 40. In 2007, De Indispensables won Best West African Act at the Channel O Music Video Awards after "I Love You" entered the Channel O Chart at number one and stayed at the top for three weeks. "Peace Song" which was recorded alongside M Trill also managed to clinch the number-one spot on the MTV Base Africa Chart for four weeks.

Artists and producers

Current

Former

References

External links
 Grafton Entertainment website 

Record labels based in Port Harcourt
Pop record labels
Hip hop record labels
Record labels established in 2004
World music record labels
Port Harcourt hip hop
Companies based in Port Harcourt
2000s establishments in Rivers State
Nigerian companies established in 2004